The Göring Attack is a line of play which occurs in the Evans Gambit chess opening. It begins with the moves:

 1. e4 e5
 2. Nf3 Nc6
 3. Bc4 Bc5
 4. b4 Bxb4
 5. c3 Bc5
 6. 0-0 d6
 7. d4 exd4
 8. cxd4 Bb6
 9. Nc3 Na5
 10. Bg5

After the Evan's Gambit (4.b4) is accepted (4...Bxb4) and the riposte (5.c3) has prompted the defensive (5...Bc5) (the second most popular retreat), play continues until 10.Bg5, the defining move of the Göring Attack. 
It is named after Carl Theodor Göring, who played it in several games against Johannes Minckwitz in 1869.
The Goring Attack came into fashion after Tchigorin played it against Steinitz in 1883. We are told Tchigorin scored his most brilliant successes with this variation 
The MCO describes it as a "tricky" opening, "which can be refuted only if you know the right moves".

Notes

External links 
 Analysis and history (PDF) (pp. 8–13)

Chess openings
1869 in chess